Kim Jung Bruun (born 21 August 1993) is a Danish badminton player.

Personal life 
Bruun is of Korean descent but does not speak the language. He was adopted by a Danish family when he was just three months old, and grew up in Copenhagen.

Achievements

BWF International Challenge/Series (8 titles, 3 runners-up) 
Men's singles

  BWF International Challenge tournament
  BWF International Series tournament
  BWF Future Series tournament

References

External links 
 

1993 births
Living people
Badminton players from Seoul
Sportspeople from Copenhagen
Danish people of Korean descent
Danish male badminton players